Kokomo Gulch is a valley in the U.S. state of Colorado.

A share of the first settlers at Kokomo Gulch being natives of Kokomo, Indiana caused the name to be selected.

References

Landforms of Summit County, Colorado
Valleys of Colorado